Mainstem may refer to:

 Mainstem (hydrology) is the principal watercourse in a riverine drainage system with multiple named streams.
 Mainstem bronchus is a medical term for a part of the respiratory system.
 "The Main Stem" is another term for the Theater District, Manhattan.